Marion Rothman was an American film editor active from the 1960s through the 1990s. She is best known for her work on two 1970s Planet of the Apes movies, as well as Mystic Pizza and Christine. She also had a screenwriting credit on the 1960 film The Wild Ride. Her first known assignment was assisting with the cutting of 1959's The Diary of Anne Frank. She served as a mentor for editor Virginia Katz in Los Angeles.

Selected filmography 
As editor:

 Memoirs of an Invisible Man (1992)
 Opportunity Knocks (1990)
 Mystic Pizza (1988)
 Club Paradise (1986)
 Starman (1984)
 Christine (1983)
 All Night Long (1981)
 Starting Over (1979)
 Comes a Horseman (1978)
 Orca (1977)
 The Island of Dr. Moreau (1977)
 Baby Blue Marine (1976)
 Lipstick (1976)
 Funny Lady (1975)
 Ash Wednesday (1973)
 Tom Sawyer (1973)
 Play It Again, Sam (1972)
 Escape from the Planet of the Apes (1971)
 Billy Jack (1971)
 Beneath the Planet of the Apes (1970)
 Che! (1969)
 The Boston Strangler (1968)

As writer:

 The Wild Ride (1960)

References 

American women film editors
American film editors